Daniel McLean may refer to:

 Daniel McLean (businessman) (1770–1823), Virginia businessman in banking and sugar refining
 Daniel McLean (Canadian politician) (1868–1950), politician in Manitoba, Canada
 Daniel McLean (sheriff) (1854–1908), politician and sheriff in Manitoba, Canada
 Daniel E. McLean (died 1980), American politician, mayor of Beverly, Massachusetts, 1937–1949
 Daniel G. McLean, American lawyer and politician in Florida
 Daniel V. McLean (1801–1869), Presbyterian minister and the fifth president of Lafayette College
 Dan McLean (journalist) (born 1947), Canadian news anchor